On 7 December 2022, 25 members of a suspected far-right terrorist group were arrested for allegedly planning a coup d'état in Germany. The group, called , which was led by a Council, was a part of the German far-right extremist Reichsbürger movement. The group aimed to re-establish a monarchist government in Germany in the tradition of the German Reich, with the government being similar to the German Empire. The group allegedly wanted to provoke chaos and a civil war in Germany so that it could take power.

Around 5,000 police forces–including 1,500 special forces—searched 130 locations throughout Germany and made several arrests, including Heinrich Prinz Reuss, a descendant of the former aristocratic House of Reuß, as well as former Alternative for Germany (AfD) MP Birgit Malsack-Winkemann. The group also included active military and police personnel. The operation against the group is considered to be the largest in Germany's history, and the public prosecutor general, Peter Frank, declared the group to be a terrorist organisation.

Members 
Prosecutors reported that approximately more than 50 organisers were Reichsbürger movement members, a cluster of far-right groups which reject the current liberal democratic basic order of Germany and are associated with violence and antisemitism. The plotters reportedly included QAnon followers and COVID-19 deniers. The group was divided into areas of responsibility. The Federal Public Prosecutor has 52 suspects and arrested 25 of them. Of those arrested, 23 remained in custody as of 14 December.

The GSG9 searched a KSK site of the  near Calw. Rüdiger von Pescatore was supposed to lead the "military arm" of the group. The Federal Public Prosecutor describes von Pescatore alongside Heinrich Prinz Reuss as a "ringleader". Von Pescatore is said to have tried to recruit police officers and soldiers. Members also included a former  Maximilian Eder, former criminal police officer Michael Fritsch from Hanover, and former  Peter Wörner from Bayreuth, who started a business for survival training. 

Malsack-Winkemann, a lawyer and judge in the state of Berlin, is said to have been designated as the future "minister of justice". She was a member of the German Bundestag from 2017 to 2021 for the AfD and was arrested on 7 December 2022. The group included at least one other AfD politician, Christian Wendler, an AfD former Stadtrat (local councillor) from Olbernhau in the Saxon Ore Mountains.

One of the properties raided by the police, hunting lodge Waidmannsheil in Bad Lobenstein, which belongs to alleged ringleader Prinz Reuss, serves as the business address for several companies linked to the London-based asset management firm Heinrich XIII. Prinz Reuß & Anderson & Peters Ltd.

Ideology and aims
The alleged aim of the group was to reestablish the German Empire. The network is alleged to have been planning an armed attack on the Bundestag since at least November 2021, as well as public arrests of politicians to cause public unrest. The "Patriotic Union" assumed that parts of the German security authorities would then have shown solidarity with their effort, which would have led to an "overthrow" and allow the group to take power.

According to the group, liberation is promised by the imminent intervention of the "Alliance," a technically superior secret coalition of governments, intelligence services and militaries of various states, including Russia and the United States, according to the prosecutors.

The group is known to be right-wing, and regularly promotes anti-semitic ideology. The planned coup included a storming of the Reichstag, the German parliament building, inspired by the 6 January 2021 United States Capitol attack. Miro Dittrich of the Center for Monitoring, Analysis and Strategy (CeMAS) said that the Reichsbürger movement was not the first far-right group to have attempted a coup, but added: "Today's group, however, was larger, further along in the planning and better connected with people trained in the [use of] weapons".

Investigations and arrests 

German police authorities began investigating the group in spring 2022. The group includes parts of the radicalised German Querdenken movement. Prinz Reuss was the starting point for the investigations, which were carried out by the Federal Criminal Police Office (BKA) under the name "Shadow". In addition, several state criminal investigation offices and state authorities for the protection of the constitution were involved. German authorities stated that the coup had been planned since November 2021 and would have been a violent, terroristic overthrow of the current government. Police had first learned about them in April 2022, when they arrested members of the so-called "United Patriots" who were said to have planned to abduct Karl Lauterbach, the federal minister of health of Germany. In September 2022 police surveillance started with the close monitoring of 52 suspects.

It was initially reported that around 3,000 police officers were involved in operations to arrest the conspirators; the total was later reported as around 5,000 police officers. The alleged conspirators mainly came from the southern German states of Bavaria and Baden-Württemberg but also included people in 9 other states, and also in Austria and Italy, where they were arrested by local law enforcement. Among those arrested were aristocrats, a former member of Parliament, and both former and active members of the military. "Vitalia B", the Russian life companion of Prinz Reuss, through whom he was able to secure interim financing from three Russian individuals, was also arrested. , a celebrity chef, was arrested on 7 December. It is alleged that Heppner was a commander of the group's military wing responsible for recruitment, obtaining weapons and building a secure communications system. Heppner would also have supplied the group's troops with food after the successful coup.

Investigators secured "at least ten illegal guns", and found, in addition, 100 cartridges from the Bundeswehr as well as 94 various legal weapons including alarm pistols and knives.

The conspirators planned to co-operate with Russia, but the public prosecutor general reported on 7 December 2022 that from what they know so far, Russia did not "react positively" to the request: a spokesperson from the Russian Embassy in Berlin later denied any involvement, and the Russian government stated there could be no question of any Russian involvement in the far-right coup plot, with spokesman Dmitry Peskov saying that it "appears to be a German internal problem".

Reactions

Domestic 
 : Interior Minister Nancy Faeser announced that authorities would respond with the full force of the law "against the enemies of democracy".

International 
 : Kremlin spokesman Dmitry Peskov denied Kremlin involvement.
 : White House Press Secretary Karine Jean-Pierre announced that the government of the United States was ready to help the German government combat extremism.

See also

 German Revolution of 1918–1919, transition of the German Empire into the Weimar Republic
 Kapp Putsch, 1920 coup attempt with similar motive
 Beer Hall Putsch, 1923 coup attempt by the Nazi Party
 20 July plot, 1944 coup attempt against the Nazi government
 Day X plot

References

Coup d'état
December 2022 crimes in Europe
2020s coups d'état and coup attempts
Coup d'état
Attempted coups in Germany
Far-right politics in Germany
Monarchism in Germany
Right-wing terrorist incidents
QAnon